Ilie Stan (born 17 October 1967) is a Romanian former football midfielder and current manager of Omani club Al-Seeb. After retirement as a player, he became a manager and was at the helm of UTA Arad, Gloria Buzău, Victoria Brăneşti, Steaua București, Zakho FC, Foolad F.C. and FC Brașov, among many others.

International career

International stats

Honours

Player
CSA Steaua Bucharest
Liga I (6): 1987–88, 1988–89, 1992–93, 1993–94, 1994–95, 1996–97
Cupa României (3): 1988–89, 1991–92, 1996–97
Supercupa României (2): 1994, 1995
European Cup runner-up:  1988–89

Cercle Brugge
Belgian Cup runner-up: 1995–96

Romania B
Nehru Cup: 1991

Coach
Victoria Brănești
Liga II: 2009–10
Liga III: 2008–09

Al-Seeb
Oman Super Cup: 2022
AFC Cup: 2022

External links

1967 births
Living people
People from Pogoanele
Romanian footballers
Romania international footballers
Romanian expatriate footballers
Romanian football managers
Romanian expatriate football managers
FC Gloria Buzău players
FC Steaua București players
Cercle Brugge K.S.V. players
AEL Limassol players
Liga I players
Liga Leumit players
Belgian Pro League players
Cypriot First Division players
Romanian expatriate sportspeople in Cyprus
Expatriate footballers in Belgium
FC Progresul București players
Hapoel Tzafririm Holon F.C. players
Expatriate footballers in Cyprus
Hapoel Petah Tikva F.C. players
Expatriate footballers in Israel
FC UTA Arad managers
CS Mioveni managers
FC Steaua București managers
FC Vaslui managers
FC Brașov (1936) managers
CS Concordia Chiajna managers
FCV Farul Constanța managers
Al-Shamal SC managers
ASA 2013 Târgu Mureș managers
Foolad F.C. managers
FC Gloria Buzău managers
FC Brașov (2021) managers
Al-Seeb Club managers
Romanian expatriate sportspeople in Iraq
Romanian expatriate sportspeople in Qatar
Romanian expatriate sportspeople in Iran
Expatriate football managers in Iraq
Expatriate football managers in the United Arab Emirates
Expatriate football managers in Qatar
Expatriate football managers in Oman
Association football midfielders